Tamaki City was a short-lived city within the Auckland metropolitan area in New Zealand.

Tamaki Borough was formed by the amalgamation of Mt Wellington and Otahuhu boroughs on 19 October 1986. Tamaki was proclaimed a city on 28 January 1987 and was dissolved on 26 October 1989 pending amalgamation with Auckland City.

References 

Auckland Region
Territorial authorities of New Zealand
Populated places established in 1986
Populated places disestablished in 1989
Geography of Auckland
History of Auckland
Former subdivisions of the Auckland Region